is a Prefectural Natural Park in southern Miyagi Prefecture, Japan. First designated for protection in 1988, the park is within the municipality of Marumori and centres upon the Abukuma River valley.

See also
 National Parks of Japan

References

External links
  Map of Abukuma Keikoku Prefectural Natural Park (30, 31, 32 & 33)

Parks and gardens in Miyagi Prefecture
Protected areas established in 1988
1988 establishments in Japan